Stewart is an unincorporated community and census-designated place in central Rome Township, Athens County, Ohio, United States. As of the 2010 census it had a population of 247. It has a post office with the ZIP code 45778.

History
Stewart was laid out in 1875, when the railroad was extended to that point. The community was named for D. B. Stewart, the original owner of the town site. A post office has been in operation at Stewart since 1874.

Geography
Stewart is located along the Hocking River, just upstream from the confluence of Federal Creek with the river. It is located at the intersection of State Routes 144 and 329.

References

Census-designated places in Ohio
Census-designated places in Athens County, Ohio
Unincorporated communities in Ohio
Unincorporated communities in Athens County, Ohio
1875 establishments in Ohio
Populated places established in 1875